The Moser Medical Graz99ers are an Austrian professional ice hockey team from Graz, Styria. The club was founded in 1999 after the previous club, EHC Graz, folded prior to the 1998–99 season due to financial difficulties. The Graz99ers started in the 1999–2000 season in the Austrian National League, Austria's second division, where they were crowned instant champions. Since the 2000–01 season they have been playing in the ICE Hockey League (ICEHL).

History
Hockey was played at Premier League level in Graz mainly from two predecessor clubs. The Hockey department of the ATSE Graz (Workers' Gymnastics and Sports Association Eggenberg) was founded in 1947 and won to date the only Graz Hockey club title at the top Austrian League level in the 1974–75 and 1977-78 season. The club was merged early nineties with the UEC Graz, shortly after the EC Graz emerged. In 2008, the Hockey section of was ATSE Graz reactivated on the league level. The new goalie was Ben Bowns.

The EC Graz (also called "the elephant") experienced under President Hannes Kartnig its heyday, finishing three times the runner-up title in the seasons 1991-92, 1992–93 and 1993–94 despite running at a high financial cost. After the departure of Hannes Kartnig, the football club SK Sturm Graz changed, they tried to rescue the EC Graz. When this plan failed, the EHC Graz was established in 1998, only to become bankrupt the same year.

Establishment and promotion to the Bundesliga
In 1999 Jochen Pildner-Steinburg founded the Graz 99ers as the successor club of the EC Graz to offer Hockey League back in the Styrian capital. The team premiered in the second division, the Austrian National League, finishing after 28 rounds played, in first place in the table. In the semifinals, the team continued after opening game defeat to persevere to a 3: 1 series win against the EHC Lustenau to meet EK Zell am See in the final. The series was decided in four games with Graz taking advantage of the opportunity for promotion to the Austrian Hockey League.

Players

Current roster
Updated 24 January 2023.

|}

Notable alumni

Steve Brûlé
Dave Chyzowski
Greg Day
Scott Fankhouser
Jiří Hála 
Rob Hisey
Tommy Jakobsen
Ivo Jan
Rumun Ndur
Doug Nolan
Steve Passmore
Marcel Rodman
Sean Selmser
Thomas Vanek

References

External links

Graz99ers official site

 
Ice hockey teams in Austria
Austrian Hockey League teams
Ice hockey clubs established in 1999
1999 establishments in Austria